HMS Harrier was a Royal Navy  screw sloop launched in 1854. She took part in the Crimean War, served on the Australia Station and took part in the New Zealand Wars.  She was broken up in 1865

Construction
Harrier was launched on 13 May 1854 from Pembroke Dockyard.

Service history

Crimean War
From 1854 to 1856 Harrier took part in the Crimean War as part of the naval force in the Baltic Sea.  She served on the South Atlantic Station before refitting in Portsmouth in 1860.

Australia station
She recommissioned on 29 October 1860 for the Australia Station. She undertook a punitive action against Fijian natives in 1863.

New Zealand Wars

She took part in the rescue operations when  was wrecked in Manukau Harbour, New Zealand and was also grounded but was refloated. She undertook operations during the Invasion of Waikato and the Tauranga Campaign in New Zealand. Her captain, Commander Edward Hay, was killed on 30 April 1864 during the storming of Gate Pā, and his coxswain, Samuel Mitchell, was awarded the Victoria Cross for his bravery.

Fate
Harrier paid off at Portsmouth on 31 March 1865 and was broken up the next year.

References

 

 

1854 ships
Ships built in Pembroke Dock
Cruizer-class sloops
Victorian-era sloops of the United Kingdom